Ramphotyphlops becki, also known as Beck's blind snake, is a species of blind snake that is endemic to the Solomon Islands. The specific epithet becki honours zoologist D. Elden Beck of Brigham Young University, collector of the holotype.

Behaviour 
The species is oviparous.

Distribution 
The type locality is Guadalcanal.

References 

 
becki
Reptiles of the Solomon Islands
Endemic fauna of the Solomon Islands
Taxa named by Wilmer W. Tanner
Reptiles described in 1948